Bon Accord Free Church is a congregation of the Free Church of Scotland in Aberdeen.

History
Bon-Accord Free Church was formed in 1828 via the secession of members of the congregation of Trinity Chapel, who purchased the Union Terrace church from a Baptist congregation. In 1834, it became a quoad sacra parish, and gained members as a result of secessions from Gilcomston Church. Minister Gavin Parker led the congregation through the Disruption. The congregation underwent a series of reaffiliations, becoming a United Free church, then Bon-Accord Church of Scotland in 1929 when the United Free church reunited with the Church of Scotland, before its most recent affiliation as Bon Accord Free Church in 2018.

Buildings
The current building was designed in 1894 by the architect Robert Gordon Wilson on the site of the Union Baptist Chapel and opened in 1896. Following the Union of 1900 it became the Bon Accord United Free Church. From 1962 to 1974 it was Bon Accord St Paul's Church before reverting to Bon Accord Free Church in 1974.

The congregation has been in the Bon Accord building ever since it was bought in 1977. Before this, they used a building on Dee Street until the building became too small for them during the 1970s. The present building on Rosemount Viaduct seats around 700 people.

Ministers

References

External links
Bon Accord Free Church Website
Online Sermons preached at Bon Accord since 1973

Churches in Aberdeen
Category C listed buildings in Aberdeen
Free Church of Scotland
Listed churches in Scotland
1845 establishments in Scotland